Avesnes-les-Aubert is a commune in the Nord department in northern France.

Population

Heraldry

See also
Communes of the Nord department

References

External links

Web Site Harmony Avesnes-Lez-Aubert (site closed)

Communes of Nord (French department)